Liquid capital or fluid capital is the part of a firm's assets that it holds as money. It includes cash balances, bank deposits, and money market investments. Since these assets provide little or no income to the firm, it will ordinarily seek to invest them in activities that offer a higher return on investment, apply them to outstanding debts, or distribute them to the firm's owners.

See also
 Circulating capital
 Fixed asset
 Liquidity

References

Capital (economics)
Corporate development